Pachchak Kuthira is a 2006 Tamil-language film written and directed by Parthiban. The film stars himself and Namitha. The film was released on 14 April 2006 to negative reviews.

Plot
Pachchamuthu (R. Parthiban), by his own confession, is a ruffian, and due to the fear he is able to whip up, he rules over a slum area in Chennai. He is a sadist, a pervert, and he treats his own mother like a slave worker and swears at her. He is always on the lookout to make a fast buck and has no qualms about doing dirty jobs for others - provided he is paid.

One day, Pachcha walks into a marriage pandal and peeps into the female dressing room through a hole. He sees the rich and fair looking bride-to-be Poovu (Namitha) removing her clothes. After seeing her completely nude, intensely aroused by her voluptuous body, Pachcha plans to have sex with her one way or the other. He beats up the groom, convinces the people there, and eventually marries the poor girl. On returning to his slum with her, his mother and other women, although complimenting Poovu on her beauty, are shocked to find this to be real. Pachcha then takes Poovu straight to his bedroom for sex. He throws some ants on her cleavage and bites it, which forces her to remove all her clothes. He then proceeds to have sex with her. He then tattoos the girl causing pain, which arouses him. He also makes her hold on to a ceiling above the ground, making her cling for her safety when she is wearing only a towel. The towel slips, slowly exposing and humiliating the girl, from which Pachcha gets sexual gratification. He then makes Poovu wear transparent blouses, transforming her from a rich higher-class woman to a local slum woman. He is comparatively dirty and gets sexual pleasure from the purity and richness of Poovu.

After marriage, Poovu turns out to be a woman with a nice heart and sympathizes with the colony people who are terrified of Pachcha. One day, Pachcha decides to test the loyalty of the colony people by pretending to be dead. But he is shocked to see the entire people in the place celebrating his death - except his mother. This changes him completely. Pachcha renounces his ways and breaks up the gang of ruthless moneylenders. The villagers celebrate.

Cast

Soundtrack
Soundtrack was composed by Sabesh–Murali.
"Thalamela Thookrom" - Aravind
"Sarasa Loga" - Karthik, Chinmayi, Suchithra
"Sangu Thaarai" - R. Parthiban
"Pottu Vechi" - M. J. Shriram, Mahathi
"Pachaya Pachaya" - Malathi, M. J. Shriram
"Adadadi Ganja Chedi" - M. J. Shriram

References

External links

2006 films
2000s Tamil-language films
Indian gangster films